Live! is an album recorded in 1971  by Fela Kuti's band Africa '70, with the addition of former Cream drummer Ginger Baker on two songs. It was released in 1971 by EMI in Africa and Europe and by Capitol/EMI in the United States and Canada. It was reissued on CD by Celluloid in 1987 and was reissued on CD in remastered form by Barclay with a bonus track from 1978.

Baker travelled with Kuti into Africa in a Land Rover to learn about the continent's rhythms, as documented in Tony Palmer's film Ginger Baker in Africa (1971). The bonus track on the Barclay CD reissue features a 16-minute drum duet between Baker and Africa '70's drummer Tony Allen recorded at the 1978 Berlin Jazz Festival. The album is on Rolling Stone'''s list of the 50 greatest live albums of all time. The album is also included in Robert Dimery's 1001 Albums You Must Hear Before You Die''.

Track listing
All songs by Fela Ransome-Kuti, except where noted.

 "Let's Start" – 8:06
 "Black Man's Cry" – 12:12
 "Ye Ye De Smell" – 13:55
 "Egbe Mi O (Carry Me I Want to Die)" – 12:37
Bonus track:
 "Ginger Baker and Tony Allen Drum Solo" – live 1978 (Fela Kuti, Ginger Baker, Tony Allen) – 16:21

Personnel
Fela Kuti – vocals, Hammond organ, percussion
Ginger Baker – drums (3, 4, 5)
The Afrika '70
Tunde Williams – trumpet
Eddie Faychum – trumpet
Igo Chiko – tenor saxophone
Lekan Animashaun – baritone saxophone
Peter Animashaun – rhythm guitar
Maurice Ekpo – electric bass guitar
Tony Allen – drums
Henry Koffi – congas
Friday Jumbo – congas
Akwesi Korranting – congas
Tony Abayomi – sticks
Isaac Olaleye – shekere

Charts

References

Fela Kuti albums
1971 live albums
Regal Zonophone Records live albums
Ginger Baker albums
Yoruba-language albums
Barclay (record label) live albums